Tigres UANL Femenil is a Mexican professional women's football club based in Monterrey, Nuevo León, Mexico that competes in the Liga MX Femenil. The club has been the women's section of Tigres UANL since 2017.  The team plays its home matches at the Estadio Universitario.

Commonly known as Las Amazonas (The Amazons), Tigres Femenil is one of only four clubs that have been able to win the Liga MX Femenil title, and the most successful one with a record five league titles, three more than city rivals C.F. Monterrey.

History

Founding and First League Tournament 
Club de Fútbol Tigres de la Universidad Autónoma de Nuevo León Femenil was founded on December 5, 2016, the same day that Liga MX Femenil was announced. In preparation for the first season of Liga MX Femenil in the second half of 2017, the team participated in a preparation tournament, the 2017 Copa MX Femenil under the management of Miguel Razo. On July 13, 2017,  previous to the start of the league, Former Tigres player and club legend, Osvaldo Batocletti, was appointed as manager of the team with the previous manager Miguel Razo becoming his assistant.  Tigres Femenil's first league match in history was a 0–0 draw against Querétaro on July 29, 2017.

In its first Liga MX Femenil tournament (Apertura 2017), Tigres ended the regular phase of the tournament 2nd with 34 pts, but they would eventually be eliminated in the semifinals of the play-offs by Pachuca.

First Title and Continuous Success 
Tigres Femenil obtained its first league title by winning the Torneo Clausura 2018. For this tournament, Tigres ended the regular phase of the tournament 3rd with 31 points. In the semifinals of the playoffs, Tigres defeated América with an aggregate scoreline of 5–1 to advance to the final against crosstown rivals Monterrey which would be the first of many Clásico Regiomontano finals in Liga MX Femenil. Tigres would end up defeating Monterrey in the final on penalties (2–4)  after a 4–4 draw on aggregate.  The second leg of this final at Estadio BBVA was at the time the highest attended club match in women's football history.

On May 7, 2018, just a few days after the Clausura 2018 final, Osvaldo Batocletti decided to step down from the position of manager in order to receive treatment for a Cancer. Ramón Villa Zevallos was appointed by the club to take over the position of manager with Batocletti becoming his assistant.

Under Villa Zeballos management the team once again reached the league final in the Apertura 2018 tournament after finishing 1st in the regular phase with 40 pts. In the playoffs Tigres eliminated Atlas in the quarter-finals (2–1), and Guadalajara (5–3) the semifinals. In the final, Tigres was defeated by America on penalties (1–3)  after a 3–3 draw on aggregate.

In the Clausura 2019, Tigres ended the regular phase of the tournament 3rd with 36 pts. In the playoffs, Tigres was once again able to reach the final. In the final Tigres defeated Monterrey once again with an aggregate scoreline of 3–2 to crown themselves league champions for the second time.

Ramón Villa Zevallos left his position of manager on May 30, 2019 just after one season in order to take the position of manager of C.D. Guadalajara. The club announced former Mexico women's national football team manager, Roberto Medina, as the new manager of the team on May 31, 2019.

With Medina at the helm, the team once again reach the league final in the Apertura 2019 after ending the regular phase of the tournament 2nd with 43 pts. In the final, Tigres once again faced Monterrey on the third Clásico Regiomontano femenil final. Unlike in the previous two finals,  Monterrey was able to win this final after defeating Tigres 2–1 on aggregate.

On October 5, 2019, Tigres hosted the first ever international friendly between clubs from Liga MX Femenil and the NWSL when it played against  Houston Dash in the Estadio Universitario. Tigres won that match 2–1.

Although the Clausura 2020 tournament was canceled by the league due to the COVID-19 pandemic, Tigres Femenil successful run continued in the Guard1anes 2020 and  Guard1anes 2021  tournaments in which Tigres was able to win both tournaments back to back after defeating Monterrey and Guadalajara respectively. By doing this, Tigres Femenil became the first team in the league to be able to win back-to back league titles. By winning the titles of the Guard1anes 2020 and Guard1anes 2021 tournaments, Tigres also automatically won the first edition of the Campeón de Campeones of the Liga MX Femenil.

In the Apertura 2021, Tigres once again reach the league final for the seventh consecutive time. In the final, Tigres was defeated for the second time by Monterrey by losing (1–3) on penalties after 2–2 draw on aggregate.

In the Clausura 2022, Tigres was eliminated in the semi-finals of the playoffs by C.D. Guadalajara, ending a run of seven consecutive league finals.

A few weeks following Tigres elimination in the playoffs of the Clausura 2022, the club decided to sack manager Roberto Medina on June 2, 2022 after more than 3 years at the role. During Medina's tenure the team obtained 3 titles and reach 4 league finals. Former Canadian international player Carmelina Moscato was appointed as manager of the team on June 9, 2022.

Grounds 

The Estadio Universitario  ("University Stadium") is the official home ground of Tigres Femenil. This 42,000-seat stadium built in 1967 is colloquially known as El Volcan  ("The Volcano").  The stadium is located in the campus of the Autonomous University of Nuevo León in the city of San Nicolás de los Garza.

Tigres Femenil play its first match in history at the Universitario on August 5, 2017, in a game against C.D. Guadalajara for match day 2 of the Apertura 2017. The match ended in a 2-0 victory for Tigres Femenil with goals from Blanca Solís and Carolina Jaramillo.

Personnel

Club Administration 

Source: Club Tigres

Coaching staff

Source: Liga MX Femenil

Players

Current squad

Managerial history

Seasons

Records

Most goals

Most appearances

Honours

National competitions 

 Liga MX Femenil
 Winners (5): Clausura 2018, Clausura 2019, Guard1anes 2020, Guard1anes 2021, Apertura 2022
 Campeón de Campeones
 Winners:  2021

Notes

References

 
Liga MX Femenil teams
Association football clubs established in 2017
University and college association football clubs
Football clubs in San Nicolás de los Garza
Women's association football clubs in Mexico
Tigres UANL
2017 establishments in Mexico